Good Night, Nurse! is a 1918 American two-reel silent comedy film written by, and directed by, and starring Roscoe "Fatty" Arbuckle and featuring Buster Keaton. The action centers in a sanitarium Arbuckle's character was involuntarily brought to by his wife to be operated on by Keaton's character for alcoholism.

Plot
A drunken Arbuckle walks the streets on a depressing, rainy night, too drunk to realize that he is being soaked by the rain. He is repeatedly denied entry to a drug store due to his drunken state and is forced to remain in the rain. He befriends a fellow drunk who he attempts to mail home by writing his address on his shirt, covering his face in stamps and placing him on top of a mailbox. He befriends a pair of street performers who play the National Anthem for him despite the pouring rain and as a reward he invites them to take shelter in his home from the rain. As Arbuckle parties in the living room with his newfound friends, his wife is awakened by the couple's pet monkey. Angered, his wife throws the street performers out and announces that she is sick of Arbuckle's drunken behavior. Reading about an operation rumored to cure alcoholism, she orders Arbuckle to undergo the operation or be thrown out of the house.

The hospital is revealed to be a sanitarium. Arbuckle is horrified when the doctor due to perform his operation (Keaton) emerges with his apron stained with blood. Arbuckle and a female patient (Alice Lake) attempt to escape, but are quickly apprehended. Doctors tell Arbuckle not to go near the girl again, claiming she is crazy. Arbuckle is taken to the operating room 13. As the doctors prepare for surgery, and after Arbuckle's attempt at postponing the surgery by slipping a clock into his shirt to make the doctors think he has an irregular heartbeat fails, Arbuckle is given anesthetic and falls unconscious.

Arbuckle awakes some time later and decides to escape from the sanitarium and bumps into the female patient from his earlier escape attempt. She tries to convince Arbuckle she is not crazy and that she has been mistakenly committed. They are pursued by doctors into the communal patients ward and a mass pillow fight breaks out between the inmates and the guards, allowing Arbuckle and the girl to escape. Once in the clear, Arbuckle asks the girl if there is anything else he can do for her. She asks him to help her get back into the sanitarium. Realizing the girl is genuinely crazy, Arbuckle ditches her by jumping into a nearby pond and pretending to drown, forcing the girl to go running for help. Doctors give chase and while attempting to flee, Arbuckle finds himself back at the sanitarium. Again he attempts to escape, this time by disguising himself as a nurse. With freedom in sight, Arbuckle runs into Keaton, who believes Arbuckle to be an actual woman and begins to flirt with him. Arbuckle goes along with it so as not to blow his cover. The nurse whose uniform Arbuckle is wearing soon arrives, blowing his cover. Arbuckle makes a break for it, pursued by Keaton across a farm and onto a track where a sponsored race is taking place. Arbuckle manages to beat the other runners to the finish line and is declared the winner. He is awarded the prize money, which he realizes he can use to buy alcohol, but the doctors track him down once again. Arbuckle attempts to run off one last time, but is wrestled to the ground by the doctors. The scene suddenly shifts back to the hospital bed with the doctors shaking Arbuckle awake after his operation, revealing the whole escape attempt to have been nothing more than a dream.

Cast
The cast is listed in credits order.
 Roscoe 'Fatty' Arbuckle as Fatty
 Buster Keaton as Dr. Hampton/woman with umbrella
 Al St. John as Surgeon's Assistant
 Alice Lake as Crazy Woman
 Joe Bordeaux (credited as Joe Bordeau)
 Kate Price as Nurse
 Dan Albert as Butler / Hospital orderly (uncredited)
 Joe Keaton as Man in Bandages (uncredited)
 Snitz Edwards as Drunken Man (uncredited)

Reception
Like many American films of the time, Good Night, Nurse! was subject to cuts by city and state film censorship boards. For example, the Chicago Board of Censors cut, in Reel 1, Arbuckle kicking woman, Arbuckle putting foot on woman's posterior, and Arbuckle pulling dress off woman and exposing her figure.

See also
 List of American films of 1918
 Fatty Arbuckle filmography
 Buster Keaton filmography

References

External links
 
 
 Good Night, Nurse! on YouTube
 Good Night, Nurse! at the International Buster Keaton Society

1918 films
Films directed by Roscoe Arbuckle
American black-and-white films
American silent short films
Cross-dressing in American films
1918 comedy films
1918 short films
Silent American comedy films
Films with screenplays by Roscoe Arbuckle
Paramount Pictures films
American comedy short films
1910s American films
1910s English-language films